Aliiroseovarius pelagivivens is a Gram-negative, aerobic and non-motile bacterium from the genus of Aliiroseovarius which has been isolated from seawater from the Geoje Island in Korea.

References 

Rhodobacteraceae
Bacteria described in 2015